Anuppur District (अनूपपुर) is an administrative district in Shahdol Division of Madhya Pradesh state in central India.

The district is bordered by Manendragarh district of Chhattisgarh state on the east, Gaurela-Pendra-Marwahi district of Chhattisgarh on the southeast, Dindori District of Madhya Pradesh on the southwest, Umaria District of Madhya Pradesh on the west, and Shahdol District on the northwest and north. The administrative headquarters of the district is Anuppur.

The district has one Jawahar Navodaya Vidyalaya, and Indira Gandhi National Tribal University, a central university  at Amarkantak.

Kotma is the largest town and oldest municipality in Anuppur district and also this town is mineral capital of Anuppur district.

The district was created on 15 August 2003 out of Shahdol District. It is part of Shahdol Division.

Anuppur district is mostly hilly and forested. The Narmada River originates from the hill of Amarkantak in the Maikal Hills, and the Son River originates nearby. Almost the entirety of the district is in the Ganga basin, while a small portion in the south in the Narmada basin.

History 
Early history of Anuppur district is not clearly chronicled. Anuppur is a newly created district out of erstwhile Shahdol district. By local belief the area of the district was the capital of king Virat. Likewise Amarkantak is associated with rishis Bhrigu, Markandeya etc. as well as Pandava brothers. The north of Son river is believed to be ruled by Magadh empire. The rulers of Mekala who seem to have come under the overlordship of the Vakatakas were known as the Panduvanshis of Mekala. The old country of Mekala lay about the present Amarkantak Hills and its name can be traced in the hills of the Maikal range. Some historians think that Mekala was a small tribe living in the tract of country, comprising the modern Amarkantaka hill and the surrounding territory.  

The Bhonsles of Nagpur built the Narmada temple. Maharaja Narendra Prasad Singh belonging to the Chauhan dynasty of Singrauli constructed the outer boundary wall of the temple complex. The Kalchuris constructed the Machendranath and the Patleshwar temple at Amarkantak. These references establish that the district was ruled by Bhonsles of Nagpur and also Kalchuris earlier.

Demographics

According to the 2011 census, Anuppur district has a population of 749,237, roughly equal to the nation of Guyana or the US state of Alaska. This gives it a ranking of 492nd in India (out of a total of 640). Its population growth rate over the decade 2001-2011 was 12.35%. Anuppur has a sex ratio of  975 females for every 1000 males, and a literacy rate of 69.08%. 27.39% of the population lives in urban areas. Scheduled Castes and Tribes make up 9.92% and 47.85% of the population respectively. The largest tribal community is the Gonds.

Kotma is the biggest town (Municipality) in Anuppur District and Barbaspur (Chondi) near Bhaloo mada coal mines is the biggest village of the Anuppur district.

Hindus are 91.63%, Muslims are 2.87%. Other religions (traditional tribal religion) are 4.73%.

Languages

At the time of the 2011 Census of India, 91.89% of the population in the district spoke Hindi, 2.97% Bagheli and 2.23% Gondi as their first language.

Education

 Govt. Tulsi College
 Govt. I.T.I. College
 Govt. Polytechnic College
 Indira Gandhi National Tribal University, Amarkantak
 Jawahar Novodaya Vidyalaya

References

External links

 Anuppur: official

 
Districts of Madhya Pradesh